Louis Filler (August 27, 1911 – December 22, 1998) was a Russian Empire-born American teacher and a widely published scholar specializing in American studies.

He was born in Dubossary, in the Kherson Governorate of the Russian Empire, to Jewish parents, and emigrated to the United States in 1914. Raised in Philadelphia, Filler attended Central High School. He received his bachelor's degree from Temple University in 1934, and his master's degree (1941) and doctorate (1943) from Columbia University.

He worked as a historian for the American Council of Learned Societies from  1942 to 1944 and then as a research historian for the Quartermaster General in Washington, D.C. from 1944 to 1946. He taught at Antioch College in Yellow Springs, Ohio, first as professor of American civilization from 1953 until 1976, and then as Distinguished University Professor of American Culture and Society, beginning in 1976.

His scholarly writings focused on muckrakers, abolition, and other reform movements. He also edited anthologies and other scholarly works.

He was a Fulbright Scholar at the University of Bristol, England, for the academic year 1950-1951 and at the University of Erlangen in Germany for the academic year 1979–80.

He lived in Ovid, Michigan and died on December 22, 1998 in Austin, Texas.

Awards
Fellow, Social Science Research Council and American Council of Learned Societies, 1953–54
Ohioana Book Award in nonfiction, 1961, for Crusade against Slavery

Works

Books
 Crusaders for American Liberalism: The Story of the Muckrakers, 1939 ff. (1993 as The Muckrakers)
 Randolph Bourne, 1943, 1965
 Laundry and Related Activities of the Quartermaster General, United States Government Printing Office, 1946
 The Crusade Against Slavery, 1830-1860, 1960 ff
 A Dictionary of American Social Reform, 1963, 1970; revised 1982 as A Dictionary of American Social Change
 The Unknown Edwin Markham: His Mystery and Its Significance, 1966
 Muckraking and Progressivism: an Interpretive Bibliography, 1976
 Appointment at Armageddon: Muckraking and Progressivism in American Life, 1976; Muckraking and Progressivism in the American Tradition, new intro, 1996
 Voice of the Democracy: A Critical Biography of David Graham Phillips: Journalist, Novelist, Progressive, 1978
 Abolition and Social Justice in the Era of Reform, 1972
 Crusade Against Slavery: Friends, Foes, and Reforms 1820-1860, 1986
 Dictionary of American Conservatism, 1987
 Distinguished Shades: Americans Whose Lives Live On, 1992

Edited works
 The New Stars: Life and Labor in Old Missouri, Manie Kendley Morgan, 1940   
 Mr. Dooley: Now and Forever, Finley Peter Dunne, 1954 
 The Removal of the Cherokee Nation: Manifest Destiny or National Dishonor?, 1962, 1977 
 The World of Mr. Dooley, Finley Peter Dunne, 1962
 Late Nineteenth-Century Liberalism: Representative Selections 1880-1900, 1962, 1978
 The Anxious Years - America in the Nineteen Thirties: A Collection of Contemporary Writings, 1963; as American Anxieties, 1993
 Horace Mann and Others, Robert L. Straker, 1963
 Democrats and Republicans: Ten Years of the Republic, Harry Thurston Peck, 1964
 A History of the People of the United States, John Bach McMaster, 1964   
 The President Speaks: From McKinley to Lyndon Johnson, 1964   
 Horace Mann on the Crisis in Education, 1965; Spanish translation 1972
 Wendell Phillips on Civil Rights and Freedom, 1965
 The Ballad of the Gallows-Bird, Edwin Markham, 1967
 Old Wolfville: Chapters from the Fiction of A.H. Lewis, 1968
 Slavery in the United States, 1972, 1998
 Abolition and Social Justice, 1972
 From Populism to Progressivism, 1978, anthology
 A Question of Quality, series : Popularity and Value in Modern Creative Writing and Seasoned Authors for a New Season, 1976–80
 Vanguards and Followers: Youth in the American Tradition, 1978, 1995
 An Ohio Schoolmistress: the Memoirs of Irene Hardy, 1980
 Contemporaries: Portraits in the Progressive Era, David Graham Phillips, 1981
 The President in the 20th Century, 1983

Introductions
 Ernest Lacy, Chatterton, 1952
 John Bach McMaster, The Acquisition of Political, Social and Industrial Rights of Man in America, 1961
 S.S. McClure, My Autobiography, 1962
 G. Lowes Dickinson,A Modern Symposium, 1963
 Robert Lincoln Straker, Horace Mann and Others: Chapters from the History of Antioch College,  1963
 Svend Petersen, A Statistical History of the American Presidential Elections, 1963
 Bernard Mandel, Samuel Gompers: A Biography, 1963
 John Bach McMaster, The Political Depravity of the Founding Fathers, 1964
 William Henry Smith, A Political History of Slavery, 1966
 Ulrich B. Phillips, Georgia and States' Rights, 1967
 Madeleine B. Stern, The Pantarch: A Biography of Stephen Pearl Andrews, 1968
 David Graham Phillips, The Cost, 1969
 David Graham Phillips, The Deluge, 1969
 David Graham Phillips, The Grain of Dust, 1970
 Brand Whitlock, Forty Years of It, 1970
 William Hapgood, The Columbia Conserve Company: An Experiment in Workers' Management and Ownership, 1975
 Benjamin A. Botkin, The American People: Stories, Legends, Folklore|Tales, Traditions and Songs, 1998

Also in published volumes
 "Movements to Abolish the Death Penalty in the United States," in Murder and the Death Penalty, 1952
 "The Dilemma, So-Called, of the American Liberal," in Antioch Review Anthology, 1953
 "The Muckrakers: in Flower and in Failure," in Essays in American Historiography: in Honor of Allan Nevins, 1960
 "Anti-Slavery Movements in the United States," in Collier’s Encyclopedia, 1962
 "Slavery and Anti-Slavery," in Main Problems in American History, 1964
 "A Tale of Two Authors: Theodore Dreiser and David Graham Phillips," in New Voices in American Studies, 1966

Among other articles and reviews
 "Susan Lenox: an American Odyssey," Accent, Fall 1940
 "Wolfville: the Fiction of A.H. Lewis," New Mexico] Quarterly, Spring, 1943
 "Murder in Gramercy Park," Antioch Review 11, December 1946
 "Edward Bellamy and the Spirited Unrest," American Journal of Economics and Sociology, April 1948
 "Randolph Bourne: Reality and Myth," The Humanist, Spring 1951
 "Harry Alan Potamkin," Midwest Journal, Winter 1951
 "Why Historians Ignore Folklore," Midwest Folklore, Summer 1954
 "John Chamberlain and American Liberalism," Colorado Quarterly, Fall 1957
 "The Question of Social Significance," Union Review 1:1:66-71, 1962
 "John M. Harlan", Leon Friedman and Fred L. Israel, eds., The Justices of the United States Supreme Court: Their Lives and Major Opinions NY: Chelsea House Publishers, 1995),

Verse
Two Poems, 1935

References

Sources
Ohio Center for the Book: Ohio Authors, Louis Filler
Ohio History: About Historians, Vol. 61 (1952)
Ohio History: About Historians Vol. 60 (1951)

1911 births
1998 deaths
People from Dubăsari
People from Kherson Governorate
Moldovan Jews
Emigrants from the Russian Empire to the United States
American people of Moldovan-Jewish descent
Writers from Philadelphia
Central High School (Philadelphia) alumni
Jewish American historians
Columbia University alumni
Temple University alumni
20th-century American historians
People from Ovid, Michigan
20th-century American male writers
American male non-fiction writers
Historians from Pennsylvania
Historians from Michigan
20th-century American Jews